Lutayan, officially the Municipality of Lutayan (Jawi: ايڠايد نو لوتين), is a 2nd class municipality in the province of Sultan Kudarat, Philippines. According to the 2020 census, it has a population of 65,644 people.

This lakeside town shares Lake Buluan with its neighboring municipality, Buluan, Maguindanao. Lutayan was carved out from Buluan in 1966. The first appointed mayor was the wife of the then-mayor of Buluan, a royalty from the Rajah Buayan Sultanate, Bai Linilang Mangelen. She was also the first ever elected Mayor of the town and served for two decades.

Geography

Barangays
Lutayan is politically subdivided into 11 barangays.
 Antong
 Bayasong
 Blingkong
 Lutayan Proper
 Maindang
 Mamali
 Manili
 Palavilla
 Sampao
 Sisiman
 Tamnag

Climate

Demographics

Economy

References

External links
Lutayan Profile at PhilAtlas.com
Lutayan Profile at the DTI Cities and Municipalities Competitive Index
[ Philippine Standard Geographic Code]
Philippine Census Information
Local Governance Performance Management System

Municipalities of Sultan Kudarat